Mallett Hall may refer to:

Mallett Hall (Lee, Maine), listed on the National Register of Historic Places in Penobscot County, Maine
Mallett Hall (Pownal Center, Maine), listed on the National Register of Historic Places in Cumberland County, Maine

See also
Mallett House (disambiguation)
Mallett (disambiguation) 

Architectural disambiguation pages